Pardon My Sarong is a 1942 comedy film starring Abbott and Costello.

Plot
Tommy Layton, a wealthy bachelor, rents a city bus to take him from Chicago to Los Angeles to participate in a yacht race to Hawai’i. The bus drivers, Algy and Wellington, are pursued by a detective hired by the bus company. They escape capture by driving the bus off a fishing pier. Layton, who is now on his yacht, rescues them and hires them to be his crew for the race. A competitor of his in the race, Joan Marshall has fired his original crew without his knowledge. He enacts revenge by kidnapping her and taking her along on the race.

While on course to Hawai’i, they encounter a typhoon and land on an uncharted island, which is also the home of Dr. Varnoff, a mysterious archaeologist. The island natives mistake Wellington as a legendary hero and inform him that he must marry Princess Luana. Meanwhile, Varnoff plans to make a volcano appear to erupt in order to trick the tribe into offering him their invaluable sacred jewel. The natives send Wellington (and the jewel) to the volcano to defeat the evil spirit of the volcano. Varnoff chases him to the volcano, where they are defeated by Wellington and Algy.

Cast
 Bud Abbott as Algy Shaw
 Lou Costello as Wellington Pflug
 Virginia Bruce as Joan Marshall
 Robert Paige as Tommy Layton
 Lionel Atwill as Varnoff
 Leif Erickson as Whaba
 Nan Wynn as Luana
 William Demarest as Det. Kendall
 Samuel S. Hinds as Chief Kolua
 Marie McDonald as Ferna
 Elaine Morey as Amo
 Tip, Tap and Toe

Production
Pardon My Sarong was filmed at Universal Studios from March 2 through April 28, 1942. The film's original draft, dated July 19, 1941, was titled Road to Montezuma.

The Ink Spots performed in this movie and were portrayed as waiters. "Do I Worry?" was a feature for lead tenor Bill Kenny and 2nd tenor Deek Watson was featured on "Shout Brother Shout" singing the lead part and playing trumpet. The famous dance group Tip, Tap and Toe danced during the nightclub scene.

World premiere
The film premiered in Costello's hometown of Paterson, New Jersey at a benefit for St. Anthony's Church.

Box-office
This film was Universal's number two grosser of 1942, bringing in $2.2 million according to Variety.

Home media
This film has been released twice on DVD. The first time, on The Best of Abbott and Costello Volume One, on February 10, 2004, and again on October 28, 2008 as part of Abbott and Costello: The Complete Universal Pictures Collection.

References

External links

 
 
 

Abbott and Costello films
1942 films
1942 comedy films
American black-and-white films
American comedy films
Films directed by Erle C. Kenton
Films set in Oceania
Universal Pictures films
1940s English-language films
1940s American films